Randy Glover (born December 31, 1941) is an American professional golfer who played on the PGA Tour in the 1960s.

Glover was born in Sanford, North Carolina. He attended the University of Tennessee. He turned professional and joined the PGA Tour in 1962.

Glover played on the PGA Tour between 1962 and 1968, winning once, the 1967 Azalea Open Invitational. He also won the 1965 Utah Open, eight South Carolina Opens and two Carolinas Opens. His best finish in a major is T-19 at the 1976 U.S. Open.

As a senior, Glover won the 1992 Carolina Senior Match Play Championship and the opening event of the 1997 Senior Series at Champions Club in Alpharetta, Georgia.

Glover lives in Clinton, South Carolina, where he works as the head professional at Musgrove Mill Golf Club.

Professional wins (12)

PGA Tour wins (1)

PGA Tour playoff record (1–0)

Other wins (11)
1965 Utah Open
1967 Carolinas Open
1969 South Carolina Open
1970 South Carolina Open
1971 South Carolina Open
1972 South Carolina Open
1973 South Carolina Open
1977 South Carolina Open, Carolinas Open
1980 South Carolina Open
1981 South Carolina Open

U.S. national team appearances
PGA Cup: 1975 (winners), 1976 (winners), 1980 (winners)

References

External links

American male golfers
PGA Tour golfers
Tennessee Volunteers men's golfers
Golfers from North Carolina
Golfers from South Carolina
People from Sanford, North Carolina
People from Clinton, South Carolina
1941 births
Living people